Ikenotani-ike Dam is an earthfill dam located in Ehime Prefecture in Japan. The dam is used for irrigation. The catchment area of the dam is 0.6 km2. The dam impounds about 2  ha of land when full and can store 101 thousand cubic meters of water. The construction of the dam was started on 1911 and completed in 1913.

References

Dams in Ehime Prefecture
1913 establishments in Japan